La Nueva España is a set of six symphonic poems by Lorenzo Ferrero written between 1990 and 1999, which is dedicated to the Spanish conquest of Mexico (once called the New Spain) in 1519–21. The suite can be considered a kind of preparatory study to the opera La Conquista (Prague National Theatre, 2005). This story—says the composer—is of great relevance and reminds us that cultural diversity is a precious asset that must not be squandered.

A typical performance lasts about one hour and ten minutes.

Analysis 
The poems can be performed individually or together. The compositional concept that underlines the cycle confirms the theatrical nature of Ferrero; each piece has its own colour, a specific character, but at the same time subtle thematic links 
hold the parts together, according to a well-calculated interplay of rhythmic, melodic and harmonic references.

The cycle follows the chronological order of the historical events:

Presagios: the Aztec chronicles prophesy disaster in the years preceding the arrival of the Spanish.
Memoria del fuego: having laid anchor at Veracruz, Hernán Cortés orders the scuttling of the ships, to prevent mutiny by the crew.
La ruta de Cortés: the Spaniards set out across inaccessible mountains and after a march of more than a thousand kilometres they reach the Valley of Mexico.
El encuentro: Moctezuma and Cortés meet on the Great Causeway leading into the capital, Tenochtitlan.
La matanza del Templo Mayor: in the absence of Cortés and taking advantage of the religious ceremonies of the Aztecs in the Templo Mayor, the Spanish massacre them.
La noche triste: the Aztecs revolt and temporarily drive out the invaders. In their retreat, the Spanish suffer heavy casualties and legend has it that Cortés wept over their losses. This episode is called La Noche Triste and the old tree where this allegedly happened is still a monument in Mexico.

Instrumentation 

La Nueva España is scored for 2 flutes (also piccolo and bass flute), 2 oboe, cor anglais, 2 clarinets, bass clarinet, 2 bassoons, contrabassoon, 4 French horns, 2 trumpets, 3 trombones, tuba, harpe, piano, celesta, timpani, 3 percussions and strings.

Discography 
In chronological order of recording:
 1998. Lorenzo Ferrero: Different Views. CD recording (partial). BMG Ricordi.
 2000. Lorenzo Ferrero: La Nueva España. CD recording. Naxos Records.

Notes

References 
 Camplani, Clara and Patrizia Spinato Bruschi, eds. (2006). Dal Mediterraneo all’America. Storia, religione, cultura. Roma: Bulzoni Editore.   
 Napoli, Ettore, ed. (2010). Guida alla musica sinfonica. Varese: Zecchini Editore. 
 Wittry, Diane (2007). Beyond the Baton: What Every Conductor Needs to Know. Oxford: Oxford University Press.

External links 
 Casa Ricordi Catalogue
 Casa Ricordi Digital Collection
 Presagios
 Memoria del fuego
 La ruta de Cortés
 El encuentro
 La matanza del Templo Mayor
 La noche triste
 La Nueva España video clip on YouTube

Compositions by Lorenzo Ferrero
20th-century classical music
Symphonic poems
Contemporary classical compositions
Orchestral suites